Quarter Gunner James Tallentine aka Tallentire (b. 1840 - d. January 15, 1865) was a Union Navy sailor who fought in the American Civil War. Tallentine received his country's highest award for bravery during combat, the Medal of Honor, for his action in the Capture of Plymouth, North Carolina, while serving on the USS Tacony. He was posthumously honored with the award after his death in the Second Battle of Fort Fisher.

Biography
Tallentine was born in England in 1840. He died on 15 January 1865 during the Second Battle of Fort Fisher, the Lieutenant commander of the USS Tacony, W. T. Truxtun, wrote in his report of the battle to the United States Secretary of the Navy, Gideon Welles, that Tallentine "...ever foremost in the discharge of his duties, reached the top of the parapet, under a murderous fire, only to fall inside the fortifications, giving a valuable life to his country."

His home was recorded in Baltimore, Maryland.

Medal of Honor citation

See also

List of American Civil War Medal of Honor recipients: T–Z

References

1840 births
1865 deaths
English emigrants to the United States
English-born Medal of Honor recipients
Military personnel from Baltimore
Union Navy sailors
United States Navy Medal of Honor recipients
American Civil War recipients of the Medal of Honor
Union military personnel killed in the American Civil War